A sandstorm is a storm caused by strong wind and sand or dust.

Sandstorm may refer to:

Games and computing
 Sandstorm (vehicle), a robotic vehicle developed by Carnegie Mellon for the DARPA Grand Challenge race
 Sandstorm (Transformers), several characters in the Transformers toyline
 Sandstorm (Dungeons & Dragons), a 3.5 edition Dungeons & Dragons sourcebook
 Sand Storm (video game), a 1992 action game
 SANDstorm hash, a cryptographic hash function
 Sandstorm: Pirate Wars, a 2016 video game

Companies
 Sandstorm Enterprises, a computer security tools company in Massachusetts
 The Sandstorm report, Price Waterhouse's report that led to the closure of the Bank of Credit and Commerce International in 1991

Film, television and theatre
 Sandstorm (1982 film), a 1982 Algerian film
 Sand Storm (2016 film), a 2016 Israeli film
 Bawandar, a 2000 Indian film (English title: The Sand Storm)
 The Sandstorm, a 2004 play by Sean Huze

Music
 "Sandstorm" (instrumental), a 1999 trance instrumental by Darude
 "Sandstorm" (Cast song), a 1995 song on Cast's debut album, All Change
 "Sandstorm", a song on Rasmus Seebach's 2013 album, Ingen kan love dig i morgen 
 "Sandstorm", a song by Level 42 on their 1982 album The Early Tapes (also known as Strategy)
 "Sandstorm", a song by La Bionda (1978)